Dorothy Alice Weisel Hack (March 7, 1910 – June 17, 1963) was born in Sacramento, California, and was an amateur American tennis player in the 1920s and 1930s. She was ranked as high as No. 3 in the U.S. rankings during her career.

Career
Hack won the Oregon state singles title in 1929. In the same tournament, she was paired with Golda Gross and reached the doubles final. She was a two-time singles quarterfinalist (1930 and 1931) at the U.S. Nationals. In 1930, she beat fourth-seeded Sarah Palfrey Cooke en route to the quarters where she lost to Betty Nuthall. She reached the final of the California state tournament in 1931, but lost to Alice Marble. In addition to this, Hack also won the Western Indoor championships in 1932. In the same year, at the tournament in Cincinnati, she won the singles title over Clara Louise Zinke, and was a doubles finalist with Helen Fulton. However, this pair were defeated in the finals match by Zinke and Ruth Oexman.

Personal life
Hack was married to fellow Sacramento native Stan Hack, a former third baseman and manager of the Chicago Cubs.

American female tennis players
Sportspeople from Sacramento, California
Tennis people from California
1910 births
1963 deaths
20th-century American women
20th-century American people